The 2012 Central Oklahoma Bronchos football team represented the University of Central Oklahoma in the 2012 NCAA Division II football season, the 107th season of Broncho football. The team was led by first year head coach and UCO alumn, Nick Bobeck. They played their home games at Wantland Stadium in Edmond, Oklahoma. This was the Bronchos first year as a member of the Mid-America Intercollegiate Athletics Association (MIAA).

The season began play began with loss to Missouri Southern State at home on August 30, and ended with loss at home to rival Northeastern State on November 10 The Bronchos finished the season 2-8. Each game of the Bronchos 2012 season was a matchup against conference opponents. The Central squad finished the season with both a conference and overall record of 2-8.

Schedule

References

Central Oklahoma
Central Oklahoma Bronchos football seasons
Central Oklahoma Bronchos football